Nathalie Götz (née Bock, born 7 November 1987) is a German football defender, who plays for Union Berlin. She started playing football for HSV Langenfeld at the age of eight. In 2002, she reached the final of the Lower Rhine Championship with Garather SV.

Career

Statistics

References

External links
 

1987 births
Living people
German women's footballers
Frauen-Bundesliga players
2. Frauen-Bundesliga players
VfL Bochum (women) players
Women's association football defenders